Sh-K-Boom Records is an independent record label and producer of recorded and live entertainment, which was founded in 2000 by Kurt Deutsch with the mission of bridging the gap between pop music and theater. In 2004 Sh-K-Boom created their second imprint, Ghostlight Records, dedicated to the preservation of traditional musical theater, spurred by the popular release of their first-ever show cast recording, Jason Robert Brown's The Last Five Years. Together the two labels have over 200 albums in their catalogues. The company has also produced over 50 live concerts as part of their Sh-K-Boom Room Concert Series, and are currently developing new and innovative projects for the stage and screen.

Sh-K-Boom and Ghostlight Records are twelve-time Grammy Award nominees and four-time Grammy winners in the Best Musical Theater Album category for In the Heights, The Book of Mormon and Beautiful: The Carole King Musical. Ghostlight's Book of Mormon album was the first Broadway cast recording to break into the Billboard Top 10 since the original 1969 release of Hair, taking its place as the biggest-selling digital cast recording of all time. The label's Original Broadway Cast Album for In the Heights also debuted at #1 on the Billboard Top Cast Albums chart and arrived on the Billboard 200 at #82.

In June 2017, Sh-K-Boom entered a joint venture with Warner Music Group's Arts Music division.

Sh-K-Boom and Ghostlight Records have produced and released the debut solo albums of Broadway stars such as Adam Pascal, Sherie Rene Scott, Patti LuPone, Sutton Foster, Kelli O'Hara, Alice Ripley, Melissa Errico, Billy Porter, Ben Vereen, Daphne Rubin-Vega, Judy Kuhn, Christine Ebersole, Julia Murney, Ashley Brown, Linda Lavin, Lea Delaria, Anastasia Barzee, and Klea Blackhurst.

Albums 

2000–2004
Adam Pascal – Model Prisoner
Sherie Rene Scott – Men I've Had
Alice Ripley – Everything's Fine
The Last Five Years
Debbie Does Dallas: The Musical
Amour
Great Joy: A Gospel Christmas
A Very Merry Unauthorized Children's Scientology Pageant
Adam Pascal – Civilian
Christine Ebersole – In Your Dreams
The New Moon

2005
Hair – The Actors’ Fund of America Benefit Recording
Little Women
Dirty Rotten Scoundrels
Altar Boyz
The 25th Annual Putnam County Spelling Bee – Original Broadway Cast Recording
Bright Lights, Big City
Jason Robert Brown – Wearing Someone Else’s Clothes
Billy Porter – Live At the Corner of Broadway + Soul
The Immigrant: A New American Musical

2006
The Great American Trailer Park Musical
See What I Wanna See
Songs from an Unmade Bed
Kevin Cahoon – Doll
Patti LuPone – The Lady With The Torch
Julia Murney – I'm Not Waiting
The Drowsy Chaperone – Original Broadway Cast Recording
George M. Cohan Tonight
title of show
Bernarda Alba
Klea Blackhurst – Autumn in New York: Vernon Duke’s Broadway
Daphne Rubin-Vega – Redemption Songs
Irving Berlin’s White Christmas
The Fantasticks
Jacques Brel is Alive and Well and Living in Paris

2007
Orpheus & Euridice
Happy End
The Bubbly Black Girl Sheds Her Chameleon Skin
Martin Short – Fame Becomes Me
High Fidelity
The Coast of Utopia
Legally Blonde: The Musical
Judy Kuhn – Serious Playground: The Songs of Laura Nyro
LoveMusik

2008
Gone Missing – The Civilians
Kelli O'Hara – Wonder in the World
David Yazbek – Evil Monkey Man
Make me a Song: The Music of William Finn (2-disc)
Christine Ebersole & Billy Stritch – Sunday in New York
In the Heights Original Broadway Cast Recording (2-disc)
Passing Strange Original Broadway Cast Recording
Little Fish World Premiere Recording
Bailey Hanks – So Much Better (Single)
Toby Lightman – Waiting (Single)
Lea DeLaria – The Live Smoke Sessions
Frankenstein - A New Musical – Original Cast Recording
Orfeh – What Do You Want From Me
13 – Original Broadway Cast Recording
Patti LuPone – Les Mouches

2009
Sutton Foster – Wish
Next to Normal – Original Broadway Cast Recording
Hair – 2009 Broadway Revival Cast Recording
Our Time Theatre Company – Listen
Pinkilicious – The Musical
Vanities, A New Musical – Original Cast Recording

2010
Sam Tsui & Kurt Hugo Schneider – The Covers
Everyday Rapture – Original Cast Recording
Bloody Bloody Andrew Jackson – Original Cast Recording
Things To Ruin: The Songs of Joe Iconis – Original Cast Recording

2011
Women On The Verge Of A Nervous Breakdown – Original Broadway Cast Recording
Catch Me If You Can – Original Broadway Cast Recording
Sister Act – London Cast Recording (American release)
The Book of Mormon – Original Broadway Cast Recording
Elf – Original Broadway Cast Recording
Anything Goes – 2011 Broadway Cast Recording
Godspell – 2011 Broadway Cast Recording
Silence! The Musical – Original Cast Recording
Melissa Errico – Legrand Affair
Anastasia Barzee – The Dimming of the Day
Footloose – Original Broadway Cast Recording (2011 Re-Release)
A Little Princess – Premiere Cast Recording

2012
Newsies – Original Cast Recording
John & Jen – Original Cast Recording (Re-release)
Bring It On: The Musical – Music Sampler
Queen of the Mist – Original Cast Recording
Calvin Berger – Original Cast Recording
35MM – A Musical Exhibition – Original Cast Recording
Carrie – Premiere Cast Recording
Pipe Dream – Live Encores! Cast Recording
Bring It On: The Musical – Original Broadway Cast Recording
Leap of Faith – Original Broadway Cast Recording
Sandy Stewart & Bill Charlap – Something to Remember
Now. Here. This. – Original Cast Recording
13 – Original West End Cast Recording

2013
Fancy Nancy the Musical – Original Off-Broadway Cast Recording
The Joe Iconis Rock and Roll JamboreeDogfight – Original Cast RecordingRodgers + Hammerstein's Cinderella – Original Broadway Cast RecordingGiant – Original Cast RecordingPippin – New Broadway Cast RecordingHands on a Hardbody – Original Broadway Cast RecordingMarry Me a Little – New Off-Broadway Cast RecordingThe Last Five Years – New Off-Broadway Cast RecordingNatasha, Pierre & The Great Comet of 1812 – Original Cast Recording

2014Murder for Two – Original Cast RecordingA Gentleman's Guide to Love and Murder – Original Broadway Cast RecordingThe Bridges of Madison County – Original Broadway Cast RecordingBeautiful: The Carole King Musical – Original Broadway Cast RecordingDisney's Aladdin – Original Broadway Cast Recording (as Executive Producers)Love's Labours Lost – Original Cast RecordingA Second Chance – Original Cast RecordingVenice – Original Cast Recording
Sherie Rene Scott – All Will Be WellAlison Fraser – Tennessee Williams: Words and MusicMary Testa & Michael Starobin – Have Faith2015The Last Five Years – Original Motion Picture SoundtrackSomething Rotten! – Original Broadway Cast RecordingThe Fortress of Solitude – Original Cast Recording
Lea DeLaria – House of DavidLady, Be Good – 2015 Encores! Cast RecordingBe More Chill – Original Cast RecordingDaddy Long Legs – Original Off-Broadway Cast RecordingClinton, the Musical – Original Cast Recording

2016The Hunchback of Notre Dame – American Premiere Studio Recording
2019

 Beetlejuice the Musical – Original Broadway Cast Recording
2021

 Fangirls – World Premiere Cast Recording

 Awards and honors 

 Drama Desk 
Sh-K-Boom & Ghostlight were awarded a special 2006 Drama Desk Award for dedication to the preservation of musical theatre through original cast albums.

 Grammy Awards and nominations 
2003Great Joy: A Gospel Christmas2005Hair – The Actors' Fund of America Benefit RecordingThe 25th Annual Putnam County Spelling Bee – Original Broadway Cast RecordingDirty Rotten Scoundrels – Original Broadway Cast Recording

2006The Drowsy Chaperone – Original Broadway Cast Recording

2008
(winner) In The Heights – Original Broadway Cast Recording

2009Hair – 2009 Broadway Revival Cast Recording

2011
(winner) The Book of Mormon – Original Broadway Cast RecordingAnything Goes – 2011 Broadway Cast Recording

2014
(winner) Beautiful: The Carole King Musical – Original Broadway Cast RecordingA Gentleman's Guide to Love and Murder – Original Broadway Cast RecordingAladdin (musical)'' – Original Broadway Cast Recording

References

External links 
Sh-K-Boom Records Official Website
Ghostlight Records

American independent record labels
Musical theatre record labels
Record labels established in 2000